Gioacchino Cocchi  (circa 1712 – 11 September 1796) was a Neapolitan composer, principally of opera.

Cocchi was probably born in Naples in about 1712, although his place of birth has also been given as Padova. His first works were performed in Naples and in Rome; the most successful was La maestra, written in Naples in 1747. It was performed at the Teatro Nuovo sopra Toledo of that city in the spring of 1747, and at the Teatro Formagliari of Bologna in October of the same year; on 11 March 1749 it was given at the King's Theatre, and in 1752 at the Teatro de' Fiorentini of Naples, with the title La scaltra governante. As La scaltra governatrice it was given at the Académie de Musique in Paris on 25 January 1753, and as Die Schulmeisterin was performed in 1954 at the Schlosstheater in Berlin. The work established a solid international reputation for Cocchi.

From 1749 to 1757 Cocchi was in Venice, where he became maestro di cappella of the Ospedale degli Incurabili, standing in for Vincenzo Legrenzio Ciampi, who had been given permission to visit London for an extended period. Cocchi also taught composition to Andrea Luchesi (1756/57). In 1757 he travelled to London, where he stayed until about 1772, when he returned to Venice. He died there on 11 September 1796.

Works
 Sinfonia for 2 Mandolins & Continuo, in 3 parts, 1) Allegro assai, 2) Largo, 3) Allegro. (Gimo 76)
 Siface, re di Numidia (1748)
 Siroe (1749)
  Alessandro nell'Indie (1761)

References

External links

1720s births
1804 deaths
Italian classical composers
Italian male classical composers
Italian opera composers
Male opera composers
Year of birth uncertain
Year of birth unknown